Maestrovox was a British company best known for its line of electron valve based electronic organs. They were designed and built by Victor Harold Ward. The first design model went on sale on 5 May 1952 at the British Industries Fair at Olympia, London, where it was hailed as the "Success of the Year" taking orders in excess of £80,000. Currently, only 24 are still known to exist.

References

Current total of known Maestrovox is 20

Further reading
 British Communications and Electronics, v. 1-2. Heywood & Co., 1954.

External links
The Official 1950's Maestrovox Information Centre Website

Electronic organ manufacturing companies
Musical instrument manufacturing companies of the United Kingdom